Mohamed Aggoun (born 21 February 2002) is a French professional footballer who plays as a right-back for Championnat National 3 side Bordeaux B.

Career 
Aggoun was the captain of his under-17 team at FC Lyon. In December 2018, he agreed to join Dijon in July 2019. However, after trials with Saint-Étienne and Bordeaux, he eventually joined the latter. Aggoun made his professional debut for Bordeaux in a 3–0 Coupe de France loss to Brest on 2 January 2022.

Personal life 
Born in France, Aggoun is of Algerian descent.

References 

2002 births
Living people
People from Vaulx-en-Velin
Sportspeople from Lyon Metropolis
French footballers
Association football fullbacks
French sportspeople of Algerian descent
FC Lyon players
FC Girondins de Bordeaux players
Championnat National 3 players
Footballers from Auvergne-Rhône-Alpes
21st-century French people